Lu Pin (born 1972 in Shanghai), is a Chinese sculptor.  Completed her studies at the Academy of Fine Arts in Warsaw under the tutelage of professor Janusz Pastwa.  Designed the monument to Frédéric Chopin in Shanghai's Zhongshan Park unveiled in 2007.

External links
" The Largest Monument to Chopin in the World Gazeta Wyborcza
"Projekt budowy pomnika Fryderyka Chopina w Szanghaju" the website of  Polish-Chinese Friendship Association
 the website of Lu Pin (sculpture)
 the website of Lu Pin (art jewelry)

Chinese sculptors
Living people
Artists from Shanghai
1972 births
Recipients of the Bronze Medal for Merit to Culture – Gloria Artis
Academy of Fine Arts in Warsaw alumni